is a Japanese actress and pop star from Mitaka-shi, Tokyo. She works for Itoh Company. From 1996 to 1997, she has also released music under the name .

Profile 

Tomosaka's father is a beautician.  In 1998, she majored in International Culture at Teikyo University, later dropping out.  In 1999, she confessed that she had an eating disorder.  When she began to appear on television, her female classmates came to ignore her suddenly.  In high school, her national popularity rose, causing her stress that resulted in anorexia nervosa and bulimia nervosa.

In April 2003, she married , a theatre director and an actor, and gave birth to her son at home in October 2004. However, she announced on her blog on December 31, 2008 that they divorced.

In September 2007, her blog had about 30,000,000 monthly views. She has maintained her management relationship with Itoh Company for modelling, endorsements and acting work. 

Tomosaka married Suneohair in 2011. They divorced in 2016.

On December 25, 2022, Tomosaka announces her marriage for the third time with an editor.

Career

In 1992, Rie Tomosaka joined the entertainment world with the commercial film of "ESTIMA" of Toyota Motor Corporation, and she also began her career as an actress with the NHK TV drama, Kora, Nanba Shiyotto in the same year.
In 1993, she came into the limelight in Subarashikikana Jinsei of Fuji TV. 
In 1995, she came to be known widely at the people because Kindaichi Shonen no Jikenbo, the manga-based popular TV mystery series, in which she co-starred with Domoto Tsuyoshi gained popular extremely. But, Domoto is a popular idol in Japan, so she was envied intensely by his fans.

In 1996, she also made her debut as a singer by "Escalation", and released "Kusyami" in succession.
Moreover, she released "Sukini nattara KIRIN LEMON" which was the theme song of a carbonated drink which Kirin Beverage of the subsidiary of Kirin Brewery Company releases and "Docchidemo IN" which was the theme song of camera "AXIA" which Fuji Film released in the name of "Sakatomo Eri" which is a logogriph of Tomosaka Rie from 1996 to 1997.

Tomosaka released eleven singles as a vocalist, often backed by members of Yokohama horn band Big Horns Bee, who toured with her. 
Her singles "Cappuccino" (1999) and "Shoujo Robot" (2000) were written and produced by her friend Shina Ringo, who also provided piano and the rhythm section from her own band.
Four other Ringo songs were also recorded in these sessions ("Mokuren no Cream," "Shampoo," "Ikenai Ko" and "Nihon ni Umarete"), subsequently released as b-sides and album cuts.
Ringo also adds chatteringto the song "Good For Us" on Tomosaka's album "Murasaki."

"Prime Colors" (45 min., 1997) was a Tomosaka solo performance in twelve distinctive shorts released to VCD.

In 2000, she starred in the TV drama Kimiga Oshietekureta Koto for which Donna Williams's Nobody Nowhere was adapted.
She played a young autistic woman, the character being inspired by the works of autistic author Donna Williams.
She played splendidly the difficult role which was considerably different from the active girl whom she played till then.
She was highly praised by Donna about an autistic performance and was highly regarded her talent as an actress.
She won the Academy Award for Best Actress of the Drama Academy Award of "THE TELEVISION"(magazine) and of the Drama Grand Prix of "Nikkan Sports"(sports and entertainment newspaper).

In 2001, Her starring performance in the feature "Kuroe(Chloe)" contributed to the film's win at the Berlin Film Festival that year.

Filmography

Television 
1992
 - (June to July, 1992, NHK-BS2)
1993
; the third season - (January to March, 1993, NHK)
 - (July to September, 1993, Fuji Television) as Haruka Takahata
1994
(episode 1) - (January 3, 1994, Fuji Television)
 - (April to June, 1994, Fuji Television) as Hitomi Ito
  the 19th episode - (September 13, 1994, Fuji Television)
 - (from October 21, 1994 to December 16, Fuji Television) as Nao Ooba
1995
 - (April 3, 1995, Fuji Television) as Tomoko
  - (On April 8, 1995, Nippon Television) as Miyuki Nanase
  season1 - (from July 15, 1995 to September 16, Nippon Television) as Miyuki Nanase
 - (October 4, 1995, Fuji Television) as Tomoko
{{nihongo|Nihon-ichi Mijikai "Haha" e no Tegami 2|日本一短い｢母｣への手紙2|The shortest letter in Japan to "Mother" 2}} episode1 {{nihongo|Atarashii Haha e|新しい母へ|To new Mother}} - (October 14, 1995, Nippon Television) as Miwa - (From October 16, 1995 to December 18, TV Asahi) as Natsumi Tateno/Sayuri Iwasaki  - (On December 30, 1995, Nippon Television) as Miyuki Nanase1996
  season2 - (From July 13, 1996 to September 14, Nippon Television) as Miyuki Nanase  - (On September 21, 1996, Nippon Television) as Miyuki Nanase - (December 23, 1996, Fuji Television) as Sayaka1997
 - (From April 19, 1997 to June 28, Nippon Television) as Asami Takigawa - (September 4 and 11, 1997, Fuji Television) as Yumi1998
 - (From January 13, 1998 to March 17, Fuji Television) On February 17, 1998, guest appearance to the episode 6, as Yukie Takeuchi - (In July, 1998, TV Tokyo) as Rie - (October 3 and 10 and 17, 1998, NHK) Chiaki Niizuma - (From October 14, 1998 to December 16, Fuji Television) as Kurumi Shirakawa1999
 - (April 2, 1999, TBS) as Miki Nakagawa - (From April 15, 1999 to June 24, Fuji Television) as Midori Kimura - (From October 17, 1999 to December 19, TBS) as Yukari Yamada2000
  - (March 18, 2000, Nippon Television) as Miki Yamaguchi - (From April 13, 2000 to June 29, TBS) as Mayuko Amemiya - (December 26, 2000, Fuji Television) as Natsuko Minami2001
 - (From January 7, 2001 to December 9, NHK) as Shouko - (From January 9, 2001 to March 20, Fuji Television) as Mariko Kayama - (From April 14, 2001 to June 30, TV Asahi) as Midori Sakaki, the first part of the second episode "" - (On April 11, 2001, Nippon Television) as Noriko Hasegawa - (August 12, 2001, NHK) as Fumiko Yamanaka - (October 4, 2001, Fuji Television) as Sally2002
 - (From 1 to 22 on February in 2002, Nippon Television) as Kumiko - (From April 9, 2002 to June 25, 2002, Fuji Television) as Akane Kawasaki - (From August 26, 2002 to October 3, NHK) as Hanako Kitaura2003
 - (From July 12, 2003 to September 20, Nippon Television) as Kizuna Kameyama - (From October 6, 2003 to November 6, NHK) as Hanako Kitaura2004
 - (January 2 & 3, 2004, TV Tokyo) as Akiko(White woman), female private detective Sato(Black woman), Mita(Blue woman)
 - (June 30, 2004, Nippon Television) as Ofuji - (From April 15, 2004 to June 24, TBS) as Mako Niimi2005
 - (From April 20, 2005 to June 22, Nippon Television) as Eriko Sawaki - (On August 21, 2005, TV Tokyo) as Yukiko Kashiwagi - (September 13, 1994, Fuji Television) as Kyoko Mizushimaanego～SP～ - (On December 28, 2005, Nippon Television) as Eriko Sawaki2006
 - (January 2, 2006 & January 3, TBS) as Funamushi (Original: Nansō Satomi Hakkenden)
 - (From January 18, 2006 to March 15, Nippon Television) as Aki Takebayashi - (April 3, 1995, Fuji Television) as Tomoko - (On March 28, 2006, Fuji Television) as chief character (nameless)
 - (On September 26, 2006, Nippon Television) as Shizuka NatsumeTokyo DisneySea 5th Anniversary Cinema - Sea of Dreams 4  - (December, 2006, web drama, Tokyo DisneySea)
2007
 - (From January 16, 2007 to March 27, Fuji Television) as Tamako Izumi - (May 4, 2007, guest starring of the 4th episode, TV Asahi) as Sleep Reiko (real name: Reiko Uzuki) - (May 29, 2007 and June 5, guest starring of the 8 & 9th episode, Nippon Television) as Emiri - (From June 30, 2007 to August 4, NHK General TV & BS hi) as Nao Tokunaga - (From October 16, 2007 to December 18, Fuji Television) as Midoriko Hojo2008
  - (From January 6, 2008 to December 14, NHK) as Ochika  - (September 6 and 7, 2008, TV Asahi) as Miharu Ootsuka  - (From October 14, 2008 to December 9, Nippon Television) as Makiko Yasuno2009
  - (From April 19, 2009 to June, TBS) as Satoko Kirihara  - (On May 1, 2009, Fuji Television) as Oman  - (On August 23, 2009, NHK General TV)
  - (From October to December 2009, Fuji Television) as Yuri Nishioka2010
  - (From September 2010 to April 2011, NHK General TV)
2014
  - (From April 2014 to September 2014, NHK General TV)
2016
  - (From April 2016, NHK BS)
  - (From October to December 2016, Nippon Television)
2023Taiga Drama ga Umareta Hi - (NHK) as Chikage Awashima

 Movies 

{| class="wikitable" 
! Year !! Film Name !! Character Name
|-
|1996|| || Tomoko Tamura
|-
|1997||||Miyuki Nanase
|-
|2000||Sentimental City Marathon||Matinee / Soiree (Double role)
|-
|2001||||Kuroe
|-
|2002||AIKI|| Samako
|-
|2003||||(Cameo appearance)
|-
|2003||1980||Kirina Ichinoe
|-
|2008||Utatama|| Kyoko Kuroki
|-
|2009||||Bokus mother (Mitsuko)
|-
|2010||A Boy and His Samurai|| 
|-
|2013||Crying 100 Times: Every Raindrop Falls|| Natsuko Nakamura
|-
|2017||P and JK|| Kako's mother
|-
|2018||Sunny: Our Hearts Beat Together|| 
|-
|2019||Sadako|| 
|-
|2020||Mellow|| 
|-
|}

Voice acting

 Stage play 
 (August, 1992)
 (August, 1999)
 Slap Sticks (February, 2003)Who's Afraid of Virginia Woolf? (June, 2006)
 M＆O plays produce  (May, 2008) Love30 Vol.3 (From June to July in 2009)
 (From 17 to 27 on September in 2009, at Tokyo Tennozu The Galaxy Theatre) as Momoko Teruuchi
Original plot:  by Monzaemon Chikamatsu

Variety show
 Ponkickies''' (1997)
 (From October 5, 1997 to March 29, 1998)
(1997.10 - 1998.12)

Television advertisement

Discography

Original albums
 Un (1997)
  (1997) (as Eri Sakatomo)
  (1999)
  (2009)

Compilation albums
 Live & Remix Rie Tomosaka vs Eri Sakatomo (1998)
 Rie Tomosaka Best (1999)
 Daisuki! (2000) (Taiwan only release, featuring unreleased song )
 Rie Tomosaka Best+3'' (2009)

Singles
"Escalation" (1996)
 (1996) (as Eri Sakatomo)
 (1996)
 (1996) (as Eri Sakatomo)
  (1997)
 "Birthday Party" (1997) (as a part of Gonna be fun, a band created for the show Ponkickies)
  (1997) (as Eri Sakatomo)
  (1997)
  (1998)
  (1998)
 "Cappuccino" (1999)
 "Shōjo Robot" (2000)

Awards
4th Nikkan Sports Drama Grand Prix - Best Actress

References

External links
ともさかりえオフィシャルサイト(Tomosaka Rie official site) tomosak.tv
ともさかりえ オフィシャルブログ(Tomosaka Rie official blog)

 TBS TV series Things You Taught Me
JMDb profile 

Japanese actresses
1979 births
Living people
Japanese women pop singers
People from Mitaka, Tokyo
Singers from Tokyo
Musicians from Nagano Prefecture
21st-century Japanese singers
21st-century Japanese women singers
Horikoshi High School alumni